This page lists Japan-related articles with romanized titles beginning with the letter K. For names of people, please list by surname (i.e., "Tarō Yamada" should be listed under "Y", not "T"). Please also ignore particles (e.g. "a", "an", "the") when listing articles (i.e., "A City with No People" should be listed under "City").

Ka
Kabuki
Kadena, Okinawa
Kadogawa, Miyazaki
Kadoma, Osaka
Kaga, Japanese aircraft carrier
Kaga Domain
Kaga, Ishikawa
Kaga Province
Takeshi Kaga
Kagami, Kochi (Kami)
Kagami, Kochi (Tosa)
Kagami, Kumamoto
Kagamino, Okayama
Kagawa District, Kagawa
Kagawa Prefecture
Kagawa, Kagawa
Kagerou (band)
Kagome Higurashi
Kagome Kagome
Kagoshima District, Kagoshima
Kagoshima Main Line
Kagoshima Prefecture
Kagoshima, Kagoshima
Kagura
Kagura (Azumanga Daioh)
Kaho District, Fukuoka
Kaho, Fukuoka
Kahoku, Ishikawa
Kahoku, Kōchi
Kahoku, Kumamoto
Kai Province
Kai, Yamanashi
Kaibara Ekken
Kaibara, Hyogo
Kaibun
Kaifu District, Tokushima
Toshiki Kaifu
Kaifu, Tokushima
Kaigan Line
Kaiji Kawaguchi
Kaiju
Kaiko Takeshi
Kaimon, Kagoshima
Kainan, Tokushima
Kainan, Wakayama
Michiru Kaioh
Kaiso District, Wakayama
Kaita, Fukuoka
Kaita, Hiroshima
Kaizen
Kaizu District, Gifu
Kaizu, Gifu
Motojirō Kajii
Kajiki, Kagoshima
Yuki Kajiura
Kajukenbo
Kakaji, Ōita
Kakamigahara, Gifu
Kake, Hiroshima
Kakegawa, Shizuoka
Kakeya set
Kakeya, Shimane
Kakigōri
Kakinoki, Shimane
Kakinomoto no Hitomaro
Kako District, Hyogo
Kakogawa, Hyogo
Michio Kaku
Kakuda, Miyagi
Kama (weapon)
Kamaboko
Kamae, Ōita
Kamagari, Hiroshima
Kamagaya, Chiba
Kamaishi, Iwate
Kamakura, Kanagawa
Kamakura period
Kamakura shogunate
Kamen Rider
Kameoka, Kyoto
Kameyama, Mie
Kami
Kami District, Kōchi
Kami, Hyōgo (Mikata)
Kami, Hyōgo (Taka)
Kamifukuoka, Saitama
Kamigori, Hyogo
Kamiita, Tokushima
Kamiishizu, Gifu
Kamijima, Ehime
Kamikatsu, Tokushima
Aya Kamikawa
Kamikawa Subprefecture
Kamikaze
Kamikaze (1937 aircraft)
Kamikaze (typhoon)
Kamikitayama, Nara
Kamimashiki District, Kumamoto
Kamimine, Saga
Kaminaka, Tokushima
Kaminoho, Gifu
Kaminoseki, Yamaguchi
Kaminoyama, Yamagata
Kamisaibara, Okayama
Kamishibai
Kamitakara, Gifu
Kamitonda, Wakayama
Kamitsue, Ōita
Kamiukena District, Ehime
Kamiura, Ehime
Kamiura, Oita
Taichi Kamiya
Kamiyahagi, Gifu
Kamiyaku, Kagoshima
Kamiyama, Tokushima
Kamo District, Gifu
Kamo District, Hiroshima
Kamo District, Shizuoka
Kamo no Chōmei
Kamo Shrine
Kamo, Kyoto
Kamo, Niigata
Kamo, Okayama
Kamo, Shimane
Kamo, Shizuoka
Kamogata, Okayama
Kamogawa, Chiba
Kamogawa, Okayama
Kamojima, Tokushima
Kamoto District, Kumamoto
Kamoto, Kumamoto
Kamou, Kagoshima
Naoto Kan
Kan'onji, Kagawa
Kana
Kanada, Fukuoka
Yasumasa Kanada
Kanagawa Prefecture
Kanagi, Shimane
Kanan, Osaka
Kanaya, Shizuoka
Kanaya, Wakayama
Kanazawa, Ishikawa
Bunko Kanazawa
Kanbara, Shizuoka
Kanda, Fukuoka
Kanda Station (Fukuoka)
Kanda Station (Tokyo)
Kaneko Shinzaemon
Shin Kanemaru
Kaneyama, Gifu
Kanezawa Sanetoki
Kani, Gifu
Kani District, Gifu
Kaniyu Onsen
Kwan-Ichi Asakawa
Kanie, Aichi
Kanji
Kanji kentei
Kanjuro Shibata XX
Kanmon Straits
Kannabe, Hiroshima
Kannami, Shizuoka
Yoko Kanno
Kanō Eitoku
Kanō school
Kanoashi District, Shimane
Kanon
Kanoya, Kagoshima
Kansai Gaidai University
Kansai International Airport
Kansai region
Kantei
Kanto Gakuin University
Kantō region
Kanuma, Tochigi
Kanzaki District, Hyogo
Kanzaki District, Saga
Kanzaki District, Shiga
Kanzaki, Hyogo
Kanzaki, Saga
Kao, Kumamoto
Kappa (folklore)
Karakuri ningyo
Karaoke
Karasu, Mie
Karasuma Line
Karate
Karatsu, Saga
Kariya, Aichi
Hermann Roesler
Karō
Karōshi
Karuta
Kasa District, Kyoto
Kasagi, Kyoto
Kasahara, Gifu
Kasai, Hyōgo
Kasama, Ibaraki
Kasamatsu, Gifu
Kasaoka, Okayama
Kasari, Kagoshima
Kasasa, Kagoshima
Ryō Kase
Kaseda, Kagoshima
Kashiba, Nara
Kashihara, Nara
Kashima, Fukushima
Kashima, Ibaraki
Kashima, Ishikawa
Kashima, Kumamoto
Kashima, Saga
Kashima, Shimane
Kashima District, Ibaraki
Kashima District, Ishikawa
Kashima Shin-ryu
Kashima Shinto-ryu
Kashima Shrine
Kashimo, Gifu
Kashiwa, Chiba
Kashiwara, Osaka
Kashiwazaki, Niigata
Kashio River
Ayumu Kasuga
Kasuga, Fukuoka
Kasuga, Gifu
Kasuga, Hyogo
Kasugai, Aichi
Kasukabe, Saitama
Kasumi, Hyogo
Kasumigaseki
Kasumori Station
Kasutera
Kasuya District, Fukuoka
Kasuya, Fukuoka
Kata
Katakana
Katana
Katano, Osaka
Katase River
Tetsu Katayama
Ukyo Katayama
Katazome
Daijiro Kato
Kato District, Hyogo
Kato Takaaki
Katō Tomosaburō
Katori, Chiba
Katori District, Chiba
Shingo Katori
Tenshin Shōden Katori Shintō-ryū
Katsu Kaishū
Katsuobushi
Katsura (tree)
Katsura District, Tokushima
Katsura imperial villa
Prince Katsura
Katsura River
Katsura Tarō
Katsura, Ibaraki
Katsura, Kyoto
Katsura, Tokushima
Katsura-no-miya
Hoshino Katsura
Masakazu Katsura
Masako Katsura
Katsuta District, Okayama
Katsuta, Okayama
Katsuragi, Wakayama
Katsuren, Okinawa
Katsushika, Tokyo
Katsuura, Chiba
Katsuyama, Fukui
Katsuyama, Fukuoka
Katsuyama, Okayama
Yasunari Kawabata
Kawabe District, Hyogo
Kawabe, Ehime
Kawabe, Gifu
Kawabe, Wakayama
Kawachi Province
Kawachinagano, Osaka
Kawage, Mie
Kawagoe, Mie
Kawagoe, Saitama
Yoriko Kawaguchi
Kawaguchi, Saitama
Kawahara, Tottori
Kawai, Nara
Kawai Gyokudo
Kawaii
Kenji Kawai
Kawajiri, Hiroshima
Kawakami, Nagano
Kawakami, Nara
Kawakami, Okayama (Kawakami)
Kawakami, Okayama (Maniwa)
Kawakami, Yamaguchi
Kawakami District, Hokkaidō
Kawakami District, Okayama
Kawakami Gensai
Hiromi Kawakami
Juria Kawakami
Kenji Kawakami
Kenshin Kawakami
Kiyoshi Kawakami
Masashi Kawakami
Otojirō Kawakami
Tomoko Kawakami
Kawaminami, Miyazaki
Kawamoto, Shimane
Kawanabe District, Kagoshima
Kawanabe, Kagoshima
Miyuki Kawanaka
Kawane, Shizuoka
Kawanishi Aircraft Company
Kawanishi H6K
Kawanishi H8K
Kawanishi N1K-J
Kawanishi, Hyōgo
Kawanishi, Nara
Kawanoe, Ehime
Kawara, Fukuoka
Kawaramachi Station
Kawasaki Heavy Industries
Kawasaki Ki-56
Kawasaki Ki-61
Kawasaki KLR650
Kawasaki motorcycles
Kawasaki, Fukuoka
Kawasaki, Kanagawa
Naomi Kawase
Kawashima Yoshiko
Kawashima, Gifu
Kawashima, Tokushima
Kawasoe, Saga
Kawauchi, Ehime
Kawaue, Gifu
Kawaura, Kumamoto
Kawazu, Shizuoka
Kaya, Kyoto
Kayakujutsu
Kayo, Okayama
Yoshihiko Kazamaru
Kazo, Saitama
Kazoku
Kazuno, Akita
Kazusa Province

Kd
KDDI

Ke
Kegon
Keicar
Keihin-Tōhoku Line
Keihoku, Kyoto
Keiko
Keio
Keio Corporation
Keio Hachiōji Station
Keiō Line
Keio Shonan Fujisawa Junior and Senior High School
Keio University
Keiretsu
Keirin
Keisaku
Keisen, Fukuoka
Kemari
Kenmu Restoration
Kendo
Kenjutsu
Kenkai
Kenpo
Kenroku-en
Kenshin Dragon Quest: Yomigaerishi Densetsu no Ken
Kensho
Kesen District, Iwate
Kesennuma, Miyagi
Ketaka District, Tottori
Ketaka, Tottori
Ash Ketchum

Ki
Ki no Tsurayuki
Ki Society
Kiai
Kibi District, Okayama
Kibi, Wakayama
Kid Icarus
Kid's Story
Kido Takayoshi
Kigo
Kiho, Mie
Kihoku, Ehime
Kihoku, Kagoshima
Kii Province
Kiinagashima, Mie
Kiire, Kagoshima
Kijo, Miyazaki
Kikai, Kagoshima
Hiroh Kikai
Kiki's Delivery Service
Kikkoman Corporation
Kikuchi District, Kumamoto
Kikuchi, Kumamoto
Kan Kikuchi
Moa Kikuchi
Kikugawa, Shizuoka
Kikugawa, Yamaguchi
Kikuka, Kumamoto
Kikuma, Ehime
Kikusui, Kumamoto
Kikuyo, Kumamoto
Kikyo
Kill Bill
Kim Saryan
Kimagure Orange Road
Kimba the White Lion
Kimi ga Nozomu Eien
Kimi ga Yo
Kimita, Hiroshima
Kimitsu, Chiba
Kimono
Kimotsuki District, Kagoshima
Ihei Kimura
Kimura Ihei Award
Takuya Kimura
Kimura spider
Kinmon Incident

Ki (cont'd)
Kin, Okinawa
King Cold
King Ghidorah
King Gidora
King K Rool
King Kong vs Godzilla
The King of Fighters
The King of Fighters: Evolution
King Records
Kingdom Hearts
Kingdom Hearts II
Kingdom Hearts: Chain of Memories
Kinhin
Kinjite
Kinkaku-ji
Kinki Kids
Makoto Kino
Kino's Journey
Kinomoto, Shiga
Kinosaki District, Hyogo
Kinosaki, Hyogo
Kinoshita Mokutaro
Kinpo, Kagoshima
Kintarō
Kintetsu Group Holdings
Kintetsu Railway
Kintetsu-Hatta Station
Kira, Aichi
Kireji
Kirin Brewery Company
Kirin Cup
Kirishima, Kagoshima (town)
Kirishima, Kagoshima (city)
Kiryu, Gunma
Kisa, Hiroshima
Kisaragi
Kisarazu, Chiba
Kisawa, Tokushima
Kisei, Mie
Nobusuke Kishi
Kishigawa, Wakayama
Kishima District, Saga
Kishimoto, Tottori
Yukito Kishiro
Kishiwada, Osaka
Kiso Mountains
Kisogawa, Aichi
Kisosaki, Mie
Kisuki, Shimane
Kita District, Ehime
Kita District, Kagawa
Ikki Kita
Kita-ku, Sapporo
Kita-Osaka Kyuko Railway
Kita, Tokyo
Kitaamabe District, Ōita
Kitadaito, Okinawa
Kitagata, Gifu
Kitagata, Saga
Kitagawa, Kōchi
Kitagawa, Miyazaki
Kitago, Higashiusuki, Miyazaki
Kitago, Minaminaka, Miyazaki
Kitago, Higashiusuki, Miyazaki
Kitahara Hakushū
Kitahata, Saga
Kitahiroshima, Hokkaidō
Kitaibaraki, Ibaraki
Kitajima, Tokushima
Saburō Kitajima
Kitakami, Iwate
Kitakata, Fukushima
Kitakata, Miyazaki
Kitakatsuragi District, Nara
Kitakuwada District, Kyoto
Kitakyushu
Kitami, Hokkaidō
Kitamorokata District, Miyazaki
Kitamoto, Saitama
Kanji Kitamura
Ryuhei Kitamura
Kitamuro District, Mie
Kitanakagusuku, Okinawa
Kitano, Fukuoka
Takeshi Kitano
Kitashigeyasu, Saga
Kitashitara District, Aichi
Kitaura, Miyazaki
Kitauwa District, Ehime
Kitayama, Wakayama
Kito, Tokushima
Kitsuki, Ōita
Kitsune
Kiyama, Saga
Kiyokawa, Ōita
Kiyomi, Gifu
Kiyone, Okayama
Kiyosu, Aichi (city)
Kiyosu, Aichi (Nishikasugai)
Kiyotake, Miyazaki
Kiwa, Mie
Kiyose, Tokyo
Kiyoura Keigo
Kizu, Kyoto

Kn
Knight Sabers
Knock Yokoyama

Ko
Ko-hyoteki class submarine
Koan
Masaki Kobayashi
Kobayashi Takiji
Kobayashi, Miyazaki
Kobe
Kobe Airport
Kobe Electric Railway
Kobe Line
Kobe Municipal Subway
Kobe Municipal Transportation Bureau
Kobe New Transit
Kobe Rapid Railway
Kobe Station
Kobe University
Kōchi, Hiroshima
Kōchi, Kōchi
Kōchi Prefecture
Kochinda, Okinawa
Kochira Katsushika-ku Kameari Kōen-mae Hashutsujo
Kumi Koda
Kodachi
Kodaira, Tokyo
Kodama (Shinkansen)
Kodama (spirit)
Kodera, Hyogo
Kodomo no hi
Koei
Kofu, Yamanashi
Kofu, Tottori
Kofun
Kofun period
Koga (InuYasha)
Koga (kuge)
Koga, Fukuoka
Koga, Ibaraki
Dan Kogai
Kogal
Koganei, Tokyo
Koge, Tottori
Kogo Noda
Kohaku
Kōhoku, Saga
Kohoku, Shiga
Koi
Koinobori
Kiyoshi Koishi
Koishiwara, Fukuoka
Koiso Kuniaki
Junichiro Koizumi
Kyōko Koizumi
Takashi Koizumi
Kojiki
Kojima District, Okayama
Hideo Kojima
Kojima Usui
Koka District, Shiga
Koka, Shiga
Kokawa, Wakayama
Kōkei (monk)
Kōkei (sculptor)
Kokin Gumi
Kokin Wakashū
Kokonoe, Ōita
Kokoro
Koku
Kokubu, Kagoshima
Kokubunji, Tokyo
Kokubunji, Kagawa
Kokubunji, Tochigi
Kokubunji, Kagawa
Kokufu, Gifu
Kokufu, Tottori
Kokura
Kokura Station
Kokyo
Komachi (Shinkansen)
Komae, Tokyo
Komagane, Nagano
Komaki, Aichi
Komatsu
Komatsu, Ehime
Rika Komatsu
Komatsushima, Tokushima
Komono, Mie
Komoro, Nagano
Kondo effect
Konjaku Monogatarishū
Chiaki J. Konaka
Konami
Konami Code
Konan, Aichi
Konan, Kagawa
Kōnan, Kōchi
Konan, Saitama
Konan, Shiga
Kondō Isami
Koji Kondo
Nobutake Kondō
Konica Minolta
Kōnin (era)
Konko, Okayama
Konoe family
Fumimaro Konoe
Kōnosu, Saitama
Kōnu District, Hiroshima
Kōnu, Hiroshima
Koopa Kid
Koopa Troopa
Kora, Shiga
Hirokazu Koreeda
Korematsu v. United States
Kōriyama, Fukushima
Koriyama, Kagoshima
Koro-pok-guru
Koryo, Nara
Koryo, Shimane
Koryū
Kosa, Kumamoto
Kosai, Shizuoka
Kosei, Shiga
Koseki
Koshi, Kumamoto
Masatoshi Koshiba
Koshigaya, Saitama
Kōshinetsu region
Kosuge Tadamoto
Kota, Aichi
Kotake, Fukuoka
Koto (musical instrument)
Koto, Shiga
Kōtō, Tokyo
Kotoamatsukami
Kotohira, Kagawa
Shusui Kotoku
Kotonami, Kagawa
Koxinga
Koya, Wakayama
Koyadaira, Tokushima
Koyaguchi, Wakayama
Koyama, Kagoshima
Koyu District, Miyazaki
Koza, Wakayama
Kozagawa, Wakayama
Kozakai, Aichi
Kozan, Hiroshima
Kōzuke Province
Kozuki, Hyogo

Kr
Adam Johann von Krusenstern

Ku
Kubokawa, Kōchi
Kubota, Saga
Kubotan
Kuchiwa, Hiroshima
Kudamatsu, Yamaguchi
Kudoyama, Wakayama
Kudzu
Kuga District, Yamaguchi
Kuga, Yamaguchi
Kugino, Kumamoto
Kuguno, Gifu
Kui, Hiroshima
Kuji, Iwate
Kujō family
Kujō Yoritsugu
Kujō Yoritsune
Kujū, Ōita
Kuka, Yamaguchi
Kūkai
Kuki Shūzō
Kuki, Saitama
Kukishin Ryu
Kuma District, Kumamoto
Kuma, Ehime
Kuma, Kumamoto
Kuma River (Japan)
Kumabito
Kumagaya, Saitama
Kumage District, Kagoshima
Kumage District, Yamaguchi
Kumakōgen, Ehime
Kumamoto Castle
Kumamoto Prefecture
Kumamoto University
Kumamoto, Kumamoto
Kumano, Mie
Kumano, Hiroshima
Kumanogawa, Wakayama
Kumatori, Osaka
Kumayama, Okayama
Kume District, Okayama
Kume, Okayama
Kumejima, Okinawa
Kumenan, Okayama
Kumite
Kumiyama, Kyoto
Kuni
Kunigami District, Okinawa
Kunigami, Okinawa
Kunikida Doppo
Kunimi, Ōita
Kunisada
Kunisaki, Ōita
Kunitachi, Tokyo
Kunitomi, Miyazaki
Kuniyoshi
Kunohe, Iwate
Kunoichi
Kunrei-shiki Rōmaji
Kurahashi, Hiroshima
Mai Kuraki
Tadashi Kuranari
Kurashiki, Okayama
Kuratake, Kumamoto
Kurate District, Fukuoka
Kurate, Fukuoka
Kurayoshi, Tottori
Kure, Hiroshima
Kuril Islands
Kuril Islands dispute
Kurino, Kagoshima
Kuririn
Kurobe, Toyama
Fukumi Kuroda
Kuroda Kiyotaka
Kurodasho, Hyogo
Kurogi, Fukuoka
Kurohone, Gunma
Kuroishi, Aomori
Kuroiso, Tochigi
Kisho Kurokawa
Kuroki Tamemoto
Kuroko
Akira Kurosawa
Kiyoshi Kurosawa
Minamo Kurosawa
Kurosawa's Dreams
Kurose, Hiroshima
Kuroshima Denji
Kurotaki, Nara
Kuru Kuru Kururin
Kurume, Fukuoka
Kurushima-Kaikyō_Bridge
Kusaba Haisen
Yayoi Kusama
Kusanagi
Kusarigama
Kusatsu, Gunma
Kusatsu, Shiga
Kuse District, Kyoto
Kuse, Okayama
Kushi
Kushihara, Gifu
Kushikino, Kagoshima
Kushima, Miyazaki
Kushimoto, Wakayama
Kushira, Kagoshima
Kushiro, Hokkaidō
Kushiro Subprefecture
Kūsō Kagaku Dokuhon
Kusu District, Ōita
Kusu, Mie
Kusu, Ōita
Kusudama
Kusunai
Kusunoki, Yamaguchi
Ken Kutaragi
Kutchan, Hokkaidō
Kutsuki, Shiga
Kineo Kuwabara
Shisei Kuwabara
Kuwana, Mie
Kuwana District, Mie
Houko Kuwashima
Kuze, Gifu

Ky
Kyōbashi, Tokyo
Kyōbashi Station (Tokyo)
Kyobashi Station (Osaka)
Kyocera
Kyodo News
Kyoho Reforms
Kyokushi, Kumamoto
Kyokushin
Kyotanabe, Kyoto
Kyoto Common Lisp
Kyoto Municipal Transportation Bureau
Kyoto Prefecture
Kyoto
Kyoto Line (Kintetsu)
Kyoto Prize
Kyoto Protocol
Kyoto School
Kyoto Station
Kyoto University
Anna Kyoyama
Kyūdō
Kyuragi, Saga
Kyūshū
Kyūshū Institute of Design
Kyushu J7W
Kyūshū Shinkansen
Kyūshū University

K